Tehachapi Pass (Kawaiisu: Tihachipia, meaning "hard climb") is a mountain pass crossing the Tehachapi Mountains in Kern County, California. Traditionally, the pass marks the northeast end of the Tehachapis and the south end of the Sierra Nevada range.

The route is a principal connector between the San Joaquin Valley and the Mojave Desert. The Native American Kitanemuk people used the pass as a trade route before the American settlement of the region in the 19th century. The main line of the former Southern Pacific Railroad opened though the pass in 1876; the tracks are now owned by the Union Pacific Railroad and shared with BNSF Railway. U.S. Route 466 was built in the 1930s, and the road is now State Route 58. The Pass is also the route of the planned California High-Speed Rail line.

The Tehachapi Mountains are also crossed by Tejon Pass at the southwest end of the range.

Nomenclature
The precise meaning of the name Tehachapi Pass is often a source of confusion. The highway sign refers to this location as Tehachapi Summit. However, the term Tehachapi Pass is routinely used to refer to both this location and the approaches on either side.

Features

The mountain pass acts as a venturi effect to air moving between ocean and desert, increasing wind speed.

The area east and south of the pass is home to the Tehachapi Pass Wind Farm, and to the west is Alta Wind Energy Center, some of California's larger wind farms.  

The pass is also a proposed route for the California High-Speed Rail line between Palmdale and Bakersfield.

See also
Tehachapi Renewable Transmission Project

References

Tehachapi Mountains
Historic trails and roads in California
Landforms of Kern County, California
Mountain passes of the Sierra Nevada (United States)
Rail mountain passes of the United States
Transportation in Kern County, California
Pass
Mojave Desert
San Joaquin Valley